Calycina sudanensis is a species of beetle in the genus Calycina. It was described in 1968.

References

Mordellidae
Beetles described in 1968